List of Estonian exile and émigré organizations

Background 
The first significant wave of Estonian emigrants abroad occurred after the failure of the 1905 revolution in Estonia, which saw the arrival of over 60,000 people into the US by 1920 according to some government estimates. This led to the formation of many Estonian American socialist and communist organisations.

The next wave came after the annexation of Estonia by the Soviet Union, up to 70,000 people fled Estonia to the West. Around half of these people sought refuge in Germany and the remainder sought refuge in Sweden. With the end of the war, many ended up in displaced persons camps.  Later, many of these emigrated to the United States, the UK, Canada and Australia. This exile community formed many organizations, most of these were cultural.

Government in exile 
 Estonian government in exile (Vabariigi Valitsus eksiilis)
 Estonian Legation in London (Eesti Saatkond Londonis)
 Estonian Consulate General in New York (Eesti Saatkond Washingtonis)

International organizations 
 Estonian World Council, (Ülemaailmne Eesti Kesknõukogu)
 Baltic World Conference
 The Baltic Council, (Balti Nõukogu)

Political parties of the pre-war era with continued existence in exile

Estonian Socialist Party's Foreign Association (Eesti Sotsialistliku Partei Välismaa Koondis)
United Peasants' Party (Ühendatud Põllumeeste Erakond), from 1962 on: Estonian Democratic Union (Eesti Demokraatlik Unioon)

Anti-communist organizations 

 Eesti Vabadusliit was formed in Berlin on February 5, 1945, by SS-Obersturmbannführer Harald Riipalu, and Ain-Ervin Mere. The organization later operated in Sweden, also using the Swedish name Estniska frihetsförbundet.
 World Legion of Estonian Liberation, (Ülemaailmne Eesti Vabadusvõitlejate Liit)
 Committee for Free Estonia
 Anti-Bolshevik Bloc of Nations
 Estonian Liberation Movement (Eesti Vabadusliikumine)
 Union of the Estonian Fighters for Freedom (Eesti Vabadusvõitlejate Liit)

National organizations

United Kingdom 
 London Estonian Society (Londoni Eesti Selts), (founded in 1921)
 Estonian Relief Committee (Eesti Vabastuskomitee), (established in 1944)
 Association for Estonians in Great Britain (1947)
 The Baltic Association in Great Britain

United States 
 Legion of Estonian Liberation Inc
 Estonian American National Council Inc (Eesti Rahvuskomitee Ühendriikides) (1952)

Sweden 
 Estonian Agronomic Society in Sweden (Eesti Agronoomide Selts Rootsis)
 Estonian National Congress in Sweden (Rootsi Eestlaste Liit)
 Eesti Komitee
 Eesti Kultuuri Koondis Rootsis
 The Baltic Committee in Sweden, (Balti Komitee Rootsis)
 Estonian Learned Society in Sweden (Eesti Teaduslik Selts Rootsis; established in 1945; associated with Estonian Academy of Sciences)
 Estonian School in Stockholm (established in 1945)

Canada 
 Estonian Central Council in Canada or Eestlaste Kesknõukogu Kanadas (EKN)
 League of Estonian Artists in Toronto, established in 1956

Estonia Houses 
 Stockholm (Stockholmi Eesti Maja)
 New York Estonian House (New Yorgi Eesti Maja)
 Toronto (Toronto Eesti Maja)
 Los Angeles (Los Angelese Eesti Maja)

United Kingdom 
 Estonian House, London, (Londoni Eesti Maja)
 Bradford 'Eesti Kodu' Club, opened in 1956
 Estonian House Club, Leicester (Leicesteri Eesti Maja), opened in 1960, was visited by President Lennart Meri in 2000.

Newspapers and magazines 

The Estonian National Library has a digitized archive of many of these publications.

Other
In 2012, the web portal Estonian World Review (www.eesti.ca) was opened. The goal of the portal is to link and show all Estonia-related actions over the world. The portal is registered in Ontario, Canada.

 Museum of Estonians Abroad

Notes

References 
 Estonian community in the UK
 INGLISMAA EESTLASTE ORGANISATSIOONIDE ARHIIVMATERJALIDE KATALOOG
 THE CONTEMPORARY BALTIC PRESS IN THE NON-SOVIET WORLD

External links
 Estonian émigrés in Australia

Exile organisations
Exile organisations
Lists of organizations
Exile organizations
Exile organisations

Exile and emigre